Syzygium koordersianum is a species of plant in the family Myrtaceae. It is a tree found in Peninsular Malaysia.

References

koordersianum
Trees of Peninsular Malaysia
Taxonomy articles created by Polbot
Taxobox binomials not recognized by IUCN